Nameoki Township is located in Madison County, Illinois, in the United States. As of the 2010 census, its population was 12,685 and it contained 5,352 housing units.

History
Nameoki is derived from a Native American name meaning "smoky".

Geography

Demographics

References

External links
Nameoki Township official website
City-data.com
Illinois State Archives

Townships in Madison County, Illinois
Townships in Illinois